London West is a provincial electoral district in Ontario, Canada, that has been represented in the Legislative Assembly of Ontario since 1999.

Geography
The district includes the northwest part of the City of London.

In 2005, it was defined to consist of the part of the city lying north and west of a line drawn from the western limit of the city along Dingman Creek, Southdale Road West, Wharncliffe Road South, Commissioners Road East, the Canadian National Railway, the Thames River, Wharncliffe Road North, Oxford Street West and Wonderland Road North.

History

The provincial electoral district was created in 1996 from parts of London South, London North and London Centre, when provincial ridings were defined to have the same borders as federal ridings. It initially consisted of the part of the city lying north and west of a line drawn from the western limit of the city along Dingman Creek, Southdale Road West, Wharncliffe Road South, Commissioners Road East, the London and Port Stanley Electric Railway, the Thames River, Wharncliffe Road, Oxford Street, Wonderland Road North and Hutton Road.

In 2005, it was given its current boundaries as described above.

The long-time MPP Chris Bentley resigned his seat in the legislature effective on February 14, 2013.  He was replaced by Peggy Sattler in the August 1st by-election. Sattler was subsequently re-elected in 2018 and 2022.

Members of Provincial Parliament

This riding has elected the following members of the Legislative Assembly of Ontario:

Election results

General elections (2014–present)

2013 by-election

The 2013 by-election in London West was called when Chris Bentley resigned his seat in the wake of the scandal regarding the cancellation of the gas plants in the 2011 election.

2013 nomination contests

General elections (1999–2011)

2007 electoral reform referendum

Sources

External links
Elections Ontario Past Election Results
Map of riding for 2018 election

Ontario provincial electoral districts
Politics of London, Ontario